Luge is a winter sport featured at the Winter Olympic Games where a competitor or two-person team rides a  flat sled while lying supine (face up) and feet first.  The sport is usually contested on a specially designed ice track that allows gravity to increase the sled's speed.  The winner normally completes the route with the fastest overall time.  It was first contested at the 1964 Winter Olympics, with both men's and women's events and a doubles event. Doubles is technically considered an open event since 1994, but only men have competed in it.  German lugers (competing under the IOC country codes of EUA, GDR, FRG and GER at different times since 1964) have dominated the competition, winning 87 medals of 153 possible.

Events

Medal leaders 

Athletes who won at least two gold medals or three medals in total are listed below.

Medal table 
Sources (after the 2022 Winter Olympics):
Accurate as of 2022 Winter Olympics.

Note: two gold medals handed in the 1972 doubles competition.

Number of lugers by nation

See also
List of Olympic venues in luge
List of multiple Olympic medalists in one event
Luge at the Youth Olympic Games

References
List of Olympic medalists in luge from the IOC. - accessed 17 February 2010.

Specific

External links

 
Olympics
Sports at the Winter Olympics